The 2010 Colorado Buffaloes football team represented the University of Colorado in the 2010 NCAA Division I FBS football season.  The team was coached by fifth-year head coach Dan Hawkins for the first nine games and interim head coach Brian Cabral for the final three games. Colorado played their homes game at Folsom Field. It was also the final season as members the Big 12 Conference in the North Division for Colorado, before joining the Pac-12 Conference for the 2011 season.  The Buffaloes failed to qualify for a bowl game, as they finished the season 5–7, 2–6 in Big 12 play, which included a historical collapse in their game against Kansas, allowing 35 unanswered points in the fourth quarter to lose the game 52-45.

Schedule

Game summaries

Georgia

Source: 
    
    
    
    
    
    
    
    
    

Colorado honored the 1990 national championship team during the week.

Mid-season head coaching change
Fifth-year Head Coach Dan Hawkins was fired on November 9, 2010 by Colorado Athletic Director Mike Bohn. Three days prior to the dismissal, Hawkins' 3-5 (0-4) Buffaloes suffered a fourth quarter meltdown that saw the 2-6 (0-4) Kansas Jayhawks overcome a 28-point deficit and outscore Colorado 35-0 in the final 11:05 of the game. It was the biggest collapse in Colorado football history.  Hawkins had never secured a winning season during his tenure at Colorado, finishing with a record of 19-39 and in the midst of a 17-game road losing streak. Bohn promoted Associate Head Coach Brian Cabral to fill in as interim Head Coach for the remainder of the 2010 season, as the University prepared for national search to replace Hawkins.

References

Colorado
Colorado Buffaloes football seasons
Colorado Buffaloes football